Doin' the Thing is a live album by jazz pianist Horace Silver, released on the Blue Note label in 1961. It was the only live album released featuring the "classic" Horace Silver Quintet.

The album was recorded at the Village Gate nightclub in New York City and features performances by Silver with Blue Mitchell, Junior Cook, Gene Taylor, and Roy Brooks.

Reception
The AllMusic review by Scott Yanow awarded the album 4½ stars and states: "This live set finds pianist/composer Horace Silver and his most acclaimed quintet stretching out". The All About Jazz review of the CD rerelease by Hrayr Attarian called the album "especially unique, not only because of its quality, but because it is the only live recording of his most famous quintet. Recorded in 1961, this CD has the power to transport one back in time to the smoky room at Village Gate where one feels the raw energy of the live performance".

Track listing
All compositions by Horace Silver.

Bonus tracks not included on original LP

All tracks recorded at the Village Gate, NYC, on May 19 & 20, 1961.

Personnel
Horace Silver – piano
Blue Mitchell – trumpet  
Junior Cook – tenor saxophone 
Gene Taylor – bass
Roy Brooks - drums

Production
 Alfred Lion – production
 Reid Miles – design
 Rudy Van Gelder – engineering
 Jim Marshall – photography

References

Albums produced by Alfred Lion
1961 live albums
Horace Silver live albums
Blue Note Records live albums
Albums with cover art by Reid Miles
Albums recorded at the Village Gate